David Coombs Dunlap (November 19, 1910 – December 16, 1994) was an American rower who competed in the 1932 Summer Olympics.

In 1932, he won the gold medal as member of the American boat in the eights competition.

External links
 
 
 
 

1910 births
1994 deaths
Rowers at the 1932 Summer Olympics
Olympic gold medalists for the United States in rowing
American male rowers
Medalists at the 1932 Summer Olympics